The 1897 NYU Violets football team was an American football team that represented New York University as an independent during the 1897 college football season. For the season, the Violets compiled a 3–3 record.

Schedule

References

NYU
NYU Violets football seasons
NYU Violets football